Pudtol, officially the Municipality of Pudtol, , is a 4th class municipality in the province of Apayao, Philippines. According to the 2020 census, it has a population of 15,491 people.

History
Pudtol, taken from Luna, was created as a municipal district on December 3, 1956 through Executive Order No. 217.

It consists of the last remained territories of municipal district Tauit (the first sub-provincial capital of Apayao), which was abolished on January 21, 1936 through EO No. 13 and annexed as a single barrio to Luna. Tauit also comprised the present-day municipalities of Luna, Santa Marcela, Flora, and some parts of Lasam and Allacapan.

Barangays Aga, Cacalaggan, Malibang and Matanguisi are comprised by then Barrio Tawit, Tauit's seat of government.

On March 31, 1959, Pudtol was converted into a municipality by virtue of EO No. 335.

On June 22, 1963, via Republic Act No. 3672, several barrios and sitios were separated from Pudtol and constituted into the newly created municipality of Flora.

Geography

According to the Philippine Statistics Authority, the municipality has a land area of  constituting  of the  total area of Apayao.

Barangays
Pudtol is politically subdivided into 22 barangays. These barangays are headed by elected officials: Barangay Captain, Barangay Council, whose members are called Barangay Councilors. All are elected every three years.

Climate

Demographics

In the 2020 census, Pudtol had a population of 15,491.

Economy

Government
Pudtol, belonging to the lone congressional district of the province of Apayao, is governed by a mayor designated as its local chief executive and by a municipal council as its legislative body in accordance with the Local Government Code. The mayor, vice mayor, and the councilors are elected directly by the people through an election which is being held every three years.

Elected officials

References

External links

 [ Philippine Standard Geographic Code]

Municipalities of Apayao
Establishments by Philippine executive order